Coquimbito is a rural district in the Maipú Department, Mendoza Province, Argentina. It is located in the southeast of the metropolitan area of Mendoza (the provincial capital), and is administratively part of the municipality of Maipú. The name refers to the Chilean port city of Coquimbo.

Coquimbito is home to many vineyards (Cabernet Sauvignon, Malbec and Syrah), together with its associated winemaking industry. Other crops include almond, olive and plum.

Well-known wineries such as Peñaflor and La Rural (Rutini brand) are found in Coquimbito. Since the late 20th century the district has become a tourist attraction, where visitors are allowed to enter the wineries, witness the manufacturing process and taste the wine before it is commercialized.

See also
Mendoza wine

External links

 Municipal website

Populated places in Mendoza Province